Damir Krstičević (born 1 July 1969) is a Croatian general and politician who served as the Minister of Defence and Deputy Prime Minister from 2016 until his resignation in May 2020, which he tendered due to the deaths of two Croatian military pilots in an aircraft accident.

Biography 
 
Krstičević was born on July 1, 1969 in Vrgorac, Split-Dalmatia County in SFR Yugoslavia. Since his childhood, he knew he wanted to be a soldier. He finished military high school in Sarajevo. Upon graduating from the Military Academy in Belgrade, Yugoslavia broke up. He joined the Croatian National Guard in the summer of 1991. He was assigned to the 4th Guards Brigade where he eventually rose to the position of the brigade's commander.

After the war, in 1997, he was sent to continue his education at United States Army War College, and finished with excellent grades.

In 2000 he was one of the signatories of the Twelve Generals' Letter, which resulted in Krstičević's retiring by then Croatian president Stjepan Mesić. He then worked as a manager, ceo, procurator and member of the supervisory board in computer software developing companies M SAN and King ICT.

In 2007, he survived a helicopter crash in Vukovar, which damaged his spine.

After HDZ won the Croatian parliamentary elections in 2016, and Andrej Plenković became the new Croatian Prime Minister, Krstičević was assigned to the position of Croatian Deputy Prime Minister and Minister of Defence.

In January 2018 he was inducted into the U.S. Army War College Hall of Fame.

In 2018 he drew criticism for praising Operation Medak Pocket saying it was 'something to be proud of' despite the fact that Serb civilians were unlawfully killed, in addition he faced heavy criticism for legitimizing the presence of convicted war criminal Mirko Norac at an anniversary 'commemorating' the attack.

See also 
 Cabinet of Andrej Plenković
 Defense Language Institute. Monterey, Ca (alumni)

References
CV on the Ministry of Defence website (accessed 12 December 2016)

1969 births
Living people
People from Vrgorac
Croatian army officers
Defence ministers of Croatia
Representatives in the modern Croatian Parliament
Military personnel of the Croatian War of Independence
United States Army War College alumni